The following is a list of programs streamed by Kapamilya Online Live, a web-based channel owned and operated by ABS-CBN Corporation. It exclusively livestreams local contents on two online video-sharing platforms, Facebook and YouTube.

For the previously streamed shows, see the list of former Kapamilya Online Live streams.

Current programming
Titles are listed in alphabetical order.

Live-gap programs
Programs are usually streamed during commercial breaks of each program.
 iWant ASAP
 Showtime Online Ü

Other programs available on YouTube feed

Drama
 All of Me 
 Ipaglaban Mo! [1992-1999 era] 
 Krystala 
 Mga Anghel na Walang Langit 
 Muling Buksan ang Puso 
 Nginiig 
 The Best of MMK 
 Sino ang Maysala?: Mea Culpa 
 Wansapanataym 
 We Will Survive

Comedy
 Banana Split 
 Home Along Da Riles

Talk show
 Gandang Gabi, Vice!

Public service
 BRGY: Our Global Barangay
 Citizen Pinoy

Lifestyle

 Keeping It Real with Rob & Ning
 Made for YouTube Originals

Interstitials
 Beats × Pieces

Newscast and documentary
 Rated Korina
 TV Patrol
 TV Patrol Weekend
 The World Tonight

Animated
 Hero City Kids Force

Comedy
 Dok Ricky, Pedia ng Barangay

Drama
 FPJ’s Batang Quiapo 
 Dirty Linen 
 Dear MOR
 The Iron Heart 

Reruns
 Ang sa Iyo Ay Akin 
 Bagito 
 Imortal 
 Be Careful with My Heart 
 Momay 
 May Isang Pangarap 
 Got to Believe 
 Nang Ngumiti ang Langit 
 Ipaglaban Mo! 
 Juan dela Cruz 
 Precious Hearts Romances Presents: Kristine 
 The Better Half 
 Wansapanataym

Reality
 The Voice Kids

Game
 I Can See Your Voice

Informative
 Team FitFil

Talk
 Kumu Star Ka!
 Magandang Buhay

Variety
 ASAP Natin 'To
 It's Showtime
 Tropang LOL 
 Made for YouTube Originals

Acquired programming

Reality
 Dream Maker: Search For the Next Global Pop Group

See also
List of programs distributed by ABS-CBN
List of programs broadcast by ABS-CBN
List of programs broadcast by Kapamilya Channel
List of programs broadcast by A2Z (Philippine TV channel)
List of iWantTFC original programming
List of ABS-CBN drama series
List of ABS-CBN specials aired

References

ABS-CBN
ABS-CBN Corporation
Lists of television series by network
Philippine television-related lists